Mina n° 0 is an album by Italian singer Mina, released in 1999.

Nine of the ten songs found in the albums were penned by Renato Zero, who also sings with the Italian diva on the song "Neri".

The album cover and artwork are designed after the famous perfume Chanel No. 5.

Track listing 
Neri - 5:18
Il cielo - 4:42
I migliori anni della nostra vita - 5:21
Fermoposta - 3:42
Galeotto fu il canotto - 4:24
Mi vendo - 4:55
Amico - 3:58
Cercami - 5:23
Profumi, balocchi e maritozzi - 3:54
Ha tanti cieli la luna - 4:34

1999 albums
Mina (Italian singer) albums